Gmajna may refer to:

 Gmajna, Ivančna Gorica, a formerly independent settlement in the Municipality of Ivančna Gorica in central Slovenia
 Gmajna, Krško, a settlement in the Municipality of Krško in eastern Slovenia
 Gmajna (Ljubljana), a formerly independent settlement in the City Municipality of Ljubljana in central Slovenia
 Gmajna, Slovenj Gradec, a dispersed settlement in the City Municipality of Slovenj Gradec in northern Slovenia

See also
 Gmajna Tree Nursery Mass Grave, in Stari Trg, Slovenj Gradec, Slovenia